Afonso, Hereditary Prince of Portugal was the first son of king John III of Portugal and his queen, Catherine of Austria. He was the Prince of Portugal but died in the same year he was born, in 1526.

1526 births
1526 deaths
House of Aviz
Princes of Portugal
Portuguese infantes
16th-century Portuguese people
Heirs apparent who never acceded
Children of John III of Portugal
Royalty and nobility who died as children